Marion County is the name of seventeen counties in the United States of America, mostly named for General Francis Marion:

 Marion County, Alabama
 Marion County, Arkansas
 Marion County, Florida 
 Marion County, Georgia 
 Marion County, Illinois 
 Marion County, Indiana 
 Marion County, Iowa 
 Marion County, Kansas 
 Marion County, Kentucky 
 Marion County, Mississippi 
 Marion County, Missouri 
 Marion County, Ohio 
 Marion County, Oregon 
 Marion County, South Carolina
 Marion County, Tennessee 
 Marion County, Texas 
 Marion County, West Virginia